The Carolina dog, also known as a yellow dog, yaller dog, American Dingo, or Dixie Dingo, is a breed of medium-sized dog occasionally found feral in the Southeastern United States, especially in isolated stretches of longleaf pines and cypress swamps. Efforts to establish them as a standardized breed has gained the Carolina Dog breed recognition in two smaller kennel clubs and full acceptance into the breed-establishment program of one major kennel club.

Originally a landrace breed, the Carolina dog was rediscovered living as free-roaming population by I. Lehr Brisbin Jr., though originally documented in American dog-related publications in the 1920s. Carolina dogs show admixture with dog breeds from east Asia.

Discovery
One of the earliest publications to document the "Indian" dogs of North America was an article by Glover Morrill Allen in 1920. Allen postulated that these "Larger or Common Indian Dogs" were descended from Asian primitive dogs:  Allen cites late nineteenth-century studies of skeletal remains of dogs that could be found from Alaska to Florida to the Greater Antilles and westward to the Great Plains, and were excavated from Indian mounds as well:

These dogs were publicized by I. Lehr Brisbin Jr., a senior research ecologist at the University of Georgia's Savannah River Ecology Laboratory, who first came across a Carolina dog while working at the Savannah River Site, which was depopulated and secured of all trespass and traffic for decades beginning in 1950.

Establishment and recognition

Since 1996, Carolina dogs can be registered with the United Kennel Club (UKC), which has published a detailed, formal Carolina Dog breed standard. UKC focuses on hunting dogs and other working dogs, and categorizes the Carolina in their "Sighthound & Pariah Group", along with other breeds such as the Basenji of Africa and the Thai Ridgeback. A breed standard has also been issued by the American Rare Breed Association (ARBA). ARBA includes the Carolina in their Group 5 along with the Canaan dog and the New Guinea singing dog.

In July 2017, the American Kennel Club (AKC, the largest dog breed registry in the United States) accepted the Carolina Dog breeding program into its Foundation Stock Service (FSS), the first step toward official AKC breed recognition. AKC has the dog listed under their "Hound" group.

Description

The ears are characteristic and are erect, very long, and moderately slender, tapering way up to elegantly pointed tips and they can be individually turned to the direction of any sound, providing extremely sensitive hearing.
The dog ranges in build from muscular yet slender and graceful to somewhat stockier animals. The dogs' legs are also graceful but strong. The hind midsection is firm and narrow. The overall build in a healthy, properly fed Carolina dog is svelte to somewhat stockier, strong and athletic. Paws are relatively large. The snout and the notably elongated, fox-like ears are spitz-like. The tail is usually upturned and often has a hooked kink in it. The coat is usually short and smooth, characteristic of a warm-climate dog.

Colors vary, and may include reddish ginger, buff, fawn, black-and-tan, or piebald with or without white areas on toes, chest, tail tip and muzzle. The eyes are at an oblique angle and almond shaped. The eyes vary in color, but are usually dark brown or medium to dark orange. The area along the edges of the eyes is often (but not always) a distinctive black "eyeliner" coloration which becomes more pronounced by contrast in lighter-colored dogs. The lips are often black, even in light-colored dogs. Frequently, puppies have a melanistic mask that usually fades as the adult coat comes in.

Behavior

Breeding in the wild
Female Carolina dogs have three estrus cycles in quick succession, which settle into seasonal reproductive cycles when there is an abundance of puppies. This is thought to ensure quick breeding in the wild before diseases, like heartworm, take their toll.

DNA evidence

Brisbin (1997) conjectured that some of the Carolina dog's ancestors arrived with prehistoric Americans.

In 2013, a study looked at the mitochondrial DNA (mtDNA) sampled from Carolina dogs. The study showed that 58% of the dogs carried universal haplotypes that could be found around the world (haplotypes A16, A18, A19, and B1), 5% carried haplotypes associated with Korea and Japan (A39), and 37% carried a unique haplotype (A184) that had not been recorded before, and that is part of the a5 mtDNA sub-haplogroup that originated in East Asia. In contrast, the Australian dingo and the New Guinea singing dog both belong to haplotype A29 which is in the a2 sub-haplogroup, hence there is no genetic relationship in the mtDNA. Also in 2013, another study of several dog breeds in the Americas – among them the Carolina dog, the  Peruvian Hairless Dog, and the Chihuahua indicated an ancient migration from East Asia.

In 2015, a study was conducted using mitochondrial (female lineage marker), Y-chromosome (male lineage marker), and autosomal genetic markers in 4,676 purebred dogs from 161 breeds and 549 village dogs from 38 countries. The study tested for the degree of admixture with European breed dogs. The study found no yDNA haplotypes indigenous to North American dogs outside of the Arctic. However, the mtDNA of Carolina dogs contained between 10%–35% pre-Columbian ancestry (mtDNA haplotype A184) that clustered with East Asian dogs.

In 2018, a study compared sequences of fossil North American dogs with fossil Siberian dogs and modern dogs. The study indicates that dogs entered North America from Siberia 4,500 years after humans first arrived, were isolated for 9,000 years, and became extinct after European contact when they were replaced by Eurasian dogs; the pre-contact dogs exhibit a unique genetic signature that is now gone, with their nearest genetic relatives being the Arctic dog breeds. Three Carolina dogs in the study exhibited up to 33% pre-contact / arctic lineage, however the study could not rule out this being the result of admixture with modern Arctic dog breeds.

See also
 Native American dogs
 Rez dog
 Saari, Carolina Dog cast member of the 2022 movie, Prey
 Canaan Dog
 Free-ranging dog
 Nureongi
 Pariah dog
 Rare breed (dog)
 List of dog breeds
 Dogs portal

Notes

References

External links
 Official United Kennel Club site, Breed information on Carolina dog

Dog breeds originating from Indigenous Americans
Dog breeds originating in the United States
Dog landraces
Feral dogs
Rare dog breeds
South Carolina culture